Pseudotropheus fuscoides is a species of haplochromine cichlid endemic to Lake Malawi where it is known from Nkhata Bay and Lion's Cove. It can be found in the aquarium trade. Some authorities consider it to be a junior synonym of Pseudotropheus fuscus.

References

fuscus
Fish of Lake Malawi
Fish of Malawi
Fish described in 1956